Mary Elizabeth Homer (born 7 September 1958) is a British businesswoman. She helped expand Topshop globally before leaving for The White Company in July 2017.

Career

Topshop
Homer was born in south-west Essex. She joined Topshop in 1985.

Jane Shepherdson left as the managing director of Topshop In 2007. Homer (the commercial director) and Karyn Fenn (the buying director) took over the running of the stores as joint managing directors. Later in 2007, Karyn Fenn left Topshop and Homer became managing director. Homer went on to become the Chief Executive Officer at The White Company with plans to focus on international expansion. Homer is in charge of homewares and fashion at The White Company.

From 2008 to 2010 she was on the board of the British Fashion Council.

See also
 Sergio Bucher, Chief Executive of Debenhams since October 2016
 Helen Connolly, Chief Executive of Bonmarché

References

1958 births
British retail chief executives
British women chief executives
Living people